East Sheen Baptist Church is an evangelical church in East Sheen in the London Borough of Richmond upon Thames. It is affiliated to the London Baptist Association. The pastor is Rev Dr Louise Hearn.

The church holds Sunday morning, and Sunday evening services. Mornings, 10:30am are family orientated with a kids club, Evenings, 6pm, are more reflective but still have a full sermon.).

A mums and toddlers group is based in the church and hall and meets on Tuesday mornings during school term times. A youth club for 7 to 11 year-olds meets on Wednesday evenings. Tuesday pm Ladies Craft, Thursday morning Computer drop in and many more activities.

References

External links

Baptist churches in the London Borough of Richmond upon Thames
East Sheen